Jiří Vočka is a Czechoslovak former slalom canoeist who competed in the 1960s and 1970s. He won a gold medal in the C-1 team event at the 1965 ICF Canoe Slalom World Championships in Spittal.

References

Possibly living people
Czechoslovak male canoeists
Year of birth missing
Medalists at the ICF Canoe Slalom World Championships